Gangapur is a town and a municipal council in Aurangabad district  in the state of Maharashtra, India.

Geography
Gangapur is located on west side of Aurangabad-Ahmednagar Highway, 38 km from Aurangabad. Gangapur is Taluka place in historical district Aurangabad. Gangapur is city of holy temples, ancient Lord Narshimha Temple, Vitthal Mandir, Ek Mukhi Datta Temple, Rameshwar Temple, Gudhicha Maroti and Baravcha Ganpati  Mukteshwar Temple, Mukunda Devi, Manjari Jagdamba Devi Temple, Jamgaon. Also a Gangapur Sugar Factory Located in Jamgaon.Jamgaon is Situated near back water of Jayakwadi so most of the area is irrigated etc. It has an average elevation of 572 metres (1876 feet)
Vitthal Asram Jakmatha & Khandoba Mandir (Katkar Vasti Jakmatha)sankateshwar mandir (Newargav)Shivaji Chouk (Gangapur)), Gangapur famous for Lord Dattatreya.

Demographics
 India census, Gangapur had a population of 41,067. Males constitute 52% of the population and females 48%. Gangapur has an average literacy rate of 71.2%, higher than the national average of 64.1%: male literacy is 74%, and female literacy is 59%. In Gangapur, 15% of the population is under 6 years of age.

Religion in Ganagapur City

Religion in Ganagapur Taluka

Education
There is St Mary's High School Wahegaon run by St Francis Education Society Aurangabad is very famous and well admired Marathi medium high school and more English medium schools.as well as Marathi medium Schools
There is one college having Arts, commerce & science streams up to degree level i.e.SHRI MUKTANAND MAHAVIDYALAYA. The college is reaccredited by NAAC with "A+" grade.

References

Cities and towns in Aurangabad district, Maharashtra
Talukas in Maharashtra